This is a list of equipment used by the Qatar Armed Forces.

Qatari Emiri Land Force

Tanks and vehicles

Fire support/Artillery 

40x Carl Gustav M2-550 84mm recoilless rifles
48x MBDA HOT anti tank missile launchers with 1,000 missiles
100x MBDA MILAN anti tank missile launchers with 630 missiles
Bofors AT4CS light ATRL
Swingfire anti tank missile
400x 9M133 Kornet with 5000 anti tank missiles on order 
50x FGM-148 Javelin command launch units with 500 anti tank missile on order

Air-defence

Small arms 
Heckler & Koch HK4
SIG Sauer P226
Smith & Wesson Model 10
Heckler & Koch MP5A3
Sterling MK-IV\L2A3
3,000x M16A-1
3,000x Colt CAR-15A1
100x Colt M4 carbine
AK-47
Heckler & Koch HK21
200x M203 grenade launcher, M203-PI
FN SCAR
Barrett M82A-1
AKM
M2 Browning machine gun
Valmet M76
Valmet M62
Heckler & Koch G3A3
FN FAL 50-00
FN MAG 60-00\T-14
FN Minimi
Mosberg Model-700

Qatar Emiri Air Force

References 

Qatar Armed Forces
Military equipment of Qatar